Jack Kavanagh may refer to:
Jack Kavanagh (hurler) (born 1988), Irish hurler
Jack Kavanagh (politician), Australian communist politician

See also
John Kavanagh (disambiguation)
 John Cavanagh (disambiguation)